Once More into the Bleach is a remix album released in December 1988 by the band Blondie and Debbie Harry. The 13-track compilation contains remixes of Blondie songs and material from Harry's solo career. It was the first compilation to include non-album singles "Rush Rush" (from the Scarface soundtrack) and "Feel the Spin" (from the Krush Groove soundtrack).

Overview
The title of the album is a pun on a line from Henry V, a history play by William Shakespeare, "once more unto the breach", with a nod to hair bleach.

The album was issued as a double vinyl, double cassette album, and on CD. On the US edition of the album track five "Rapture" (Bonus Beats) is replaced with the original version of "Atomic" from the album Eat to the Beat.

Once More into the Bleach spun off two single releases: "Denis", a remix by Dancin' Danny D which is the first official Blondie remix single (also known as "Denis '88") and "Call Me", a remix by Ben Liebrand. The singles reached numbers 50 and 61 on the UK Singles Chart respectively. The Shep Pettibone remix of "Heart of Glass" had a limited release as a single in several territories.

Track listing

Personnel
 Richard Gottehrer - producer ("Denis")
 Mike Chapman - producer ("Heart of Glass", "Rapture", "The Tide Is High" and "Sunday Girl")
 Giorgio Moroder - producer ("Call Me" and "Rush Rush")
 Bernard Edwards - producer ("The Jam Was Moving" and "Backfired") 
 Nile Rodgers - producer ("The Jam Was Moving" and "Backfired")
 Seth Justman - producer ("In Love with Love" and "French Kissin' in the USA")
 John Benitez - producer ("Feel the Spin")

Charts

References

Once More Into The Bleach
Albums produced by Nile Rodgers
Albums produced by Bernard Edwards
Albums produced by Richard Gottehrer
Albums produced by Mike Chapman
Once More Into The Bleach
Once More Into The Bleach
Chrysalis Records remix albums
Split albums